Congleton Town Football Club is an association football club based in Congleton, Cheshire, England. The club have played in a number of regional leagues in the Cheshire area.

History
The club was formed in 1901 and joined the Crewe and District League, and were crowned champions in their first three seasons from 1901–02 to 1903–04. In 1904–05 they finished in fifth place. They then joined the North Staffordshire and District League in the 1905–06 season finishing in third place. Up until the outbreak of World War I their highest league placing came in 1914–15 when they were runners-up. When the league resumed after the war Congleton spent one last season in the league, 1919–20 finishing as league champions.

In 1920 they joined the Cheshire County League, finishing as runners-up to Winsford in their first season, 1920–21, under player-manager Hugh Moffat. In 1939–40 they spent one season in the Macclesfield and District League, finishing in equal first place and winning the end of season play-off against Bollington Cross to be crowned champions.

When football resumed after World War II Congleton Town were once again back in the Cheshire County League. However, the struggled at first including finishing in last place in 1947–48. The club continued to struggle and spent the 1950s finishing toward the bottom of the table each season.

They began the 1960s still struggling culminating in a last place finish in 1964–65, before joining the Manchester League in the 1965–66 season, finishing in fifth place. Their stay in the league though lasted just three seasons and in the 1968–69 season they joined the Mid-Cheshire League, finishing in eighth place. In 1969–70 they were runners-up. They were runners-up again in 1971–72 then in 1973–74 they were crowned Mid-Cheshire league champions. The following season they finished third before winning the league for a second time in 1975–76. After another runners-up finish in 1976–77 they won the title for a third time in 1977–78, their last season in the league.
.
In 1978 the club re-joined the Cheshire County League, finishing in seventh place in their first season back in the league, 1978–79. They won the league in its final season, 1981–82 before the league merged with the Lancashire Combination to form the North West Counties Football League in which they were founder members in 1982–83. In 1985–86 they were runners-up in the league, only missing out on the title on goal difference. In 1987–88 they joined the Northern Premier League in the newly created Division One, finishing in ninth place. In the 1989–90 season, they reached the First Round of the FA Cup after beating Witton Albion in the fourth qualifying round. In the first round they were drawn away to Football League club Crewe Alexandra where they lost 2–0. However, they struggled most years at the higher level of the Northern Premier League and after finishing in last place in the 2000–01 season, they were relegated to the North West Counties Football League Division One.

At the end of the 2001–02 season, Congleton were denied the chance of winning the Mid Cheshire Cup title in a controversial Final against Northwich Victoria. Northwich won the Cup in a penalty shoot out but it was discovered after the match that their winning penalty taker had actually been substituted prior to the shoot out taking place. Despite protests from some supporters, the result was allowed to stand in the match taking place at Northwich's own ground.

They did though reach the fourth round of the FA Trophy where they lost 6–2 to Worksop Town. The club remained in Division One which was renamed the Premier Division for the 2008–09 season.

At the end of the 2008–09 season, Congleton finished fourth in the Premier Division, behind AFC Fylde, New Mills and Newcastle Town, with only the first placed side gaining promotion to the Northern Premier League. Regardless of where they had finished, Congleton would not have gained promotion because they did not submit a promotion application.

At the end of the 2010–11 season joint managers Anthony Buckle and Darren Twigg stepped down. Giuseppe "Joe" Paladino, ex-Wigan Athletic goalkeeper, who was assistant manager at Rossendale United at the end of last season was appointed at the beginning of the season, but some disappointing results and declining attendances saw his reign short-lived. He was replaced on 6 November 2011 by Dean Sibson, who took on the role of caretaker manager until a successor was appointed on 31 January 2012. Jim Vince, former FC Halifax, Witton Albion, Woodley Sports and Abbey Hey manager now takes up the reins.

In November 2014 it was announced that Jim Vince would step down as manager after three years in the role. Assistants Steve Hardy and Mike McDonald would take temporary charge. At the end of the 2020–21 season the club were transferred to the Premier Division of the Midland League. This was only temporary as they were allowed to return to the North West Counties league on appeal.

Community ownership
In May 2014, the club was taken over by a community benefit society owned by fans of the club.

Stadium

The team initially played its matches on the Chaddock-Lowndes field at the top of Booth Street before moving to its current site on the upper half of the adjacent West Field in the summer of 1903.

The main stand has 250 seats and all four sides of the pitch now offer covered standing areas for supporters. The stadium is currently known as the Cleric Stadium for sponsorship reasons.

Current squad

Club management and coaching staff

Honours

League
Cheshire County League Division Two
Champions: 1981-82
Mid-Cheshire League
Champions (3): 1973–74, 1975–76, 1977–78
Macclesfield and District League 
Champions: 1939–40
North Staffordshire and District League
Champions: 1919-20
Crewe and District League
Champions (3): 1901–02, 1902–03, 1903–04

Cup
Cheshire Senior Cup
Winners (2): 1920–21, 1937–38
Mid-Cheshire Senior Cup
Winners: 2006–07
Cheshire Saturday Cup
Winners: 1977–78
Crewe and District Cup
Winners: 1903–04

Notable players

Congleton Town F.C. players who attained at least one international cap during their career.

Club Records

Highest home attendance: 6,800 vs Macclesfield Town, 1953–54
Highest league finish: 6th in Northern Premier League Division 1 (7th tier/Step 3), 1989–90
Best FA Cup performance: 1st Round, 1989–90
Best FA Trophy performance: 4th Round, 2000–01
Best FA Vase performance: Semi-finals, 2022–23
Highest transfer fee received: £5,000 paid by Leeds United for Des Frost, 1948–49

Average attendance

Source: Tony Kempster's site Non League Matters NW Counties Football League site

References

External links
Official website

Congleton
Fan-owned football clubs in England
Football clubs in England
Football clubs in Cheshire
Association football clubs established in 1901
North West Counties Football League clubs
1901 establishments in England
Cheshire County League clubs